KMB Football Team was an Hong Kong association football club.

The club last played in the Hong Kong football league system during the 2017–18 season when they finished bottom, and were eliminated from the system as a result.

Honours

Domestic 
Hong Kong First Division League (1st tier)
 Champions (2): 1953–54, 1966–67
Hong Kong Senior Shield
 Champions (1): 1950–51 
 Runners-up (1): 1953–54, 1956–57, 1957–58, 1963–64

Performance in Asian club competitions

See also 
 Kowloon Motor Bus

External links 
 KMB at HKFA

Football clubs in Hong Kong
Works association football clubs in Hong Kong